Nirmal is a town in Telangana, India. 

Nirmal means "pure" or "unsullied" in Sanskrit.

Nirmal may also refer to:

 Nirmal furniture
 Nirmal paintings
 Nirmal toys and craft
 Nirmal (Assembly constituency)

List of people who bear the name Nirmal:

 Nirmal Baba, an Indian spiritual leader
 Nirmal Jain (born 1966/67), Indian billionaire, founder of India Infoline

See also 
 Nirmala (sect), a Sikh religious order
 Nirmala